This list of communities in Kings County, Nova Scotia is ordered by the highways upon which the communities are located.  All routes start with the terminus located near the largest community.

Trunk Routes

Trunk 1: Wolfville - Greenwich - New Minas - Kentville - Coldbrook - Cambridge - Waterville - Berwick - Aylesford - Auburn - Kingston
Trunk 12: Kentville - South Alton- Blue Mountain

Collector Roads

Route 221: Kingsport - Canning - Sheffield Mills- Centreville - Billtown - Lakeville - Buckleys Corner - Dempseys Corner - North Kingston 
Route 341: Kentville - Canard
Route 358: Greenwich - Port Williams - Canard - Canning - The Lookoff - Scot's Bay
Route 359: Kentville - Aldershot - Centreville - Hall's Harbour
Route 360: Morristown - Berwick - Somerset - Harbourville

Communities located on rural roads

Avonport
Avonport Station
Baxter's Harbour
Benjamin Bridge
Bishopville
Black River
Black Rock
Blomidon
Burlington
Canaan
Canada Creek
Cornwallis Square
Dalhousie Road
Factorydale
Gaspereau
Glenmont
Grand Pre
Greenfield
Lake George
Lakeville
Lake Paul
Medford
Melanson
Millville
Morden
Nicholsville
Ogilvie
Pereaux
Ross Corner
Ross Creek
Starr's Point
Tremont
Vernon Mills
Victoria Harbour
Woodside

See also

Kings County, Nova Scotia